Nicholas J. Wall (December 18, 1906 – March 17, 1983) was a Newfoundland Colony born jockey who competed successfully in Canada and was the 1938 National Champion rider in the United States.

Born in Lower Gully, Kelligrews, Conception Bay, Newfoundland Colony, while still a small boy Nick Wall's family moved to Glace Bay, Nova Scotia. A coal mining town, the diminutive Wall work in the mines as a pony rider. He began his professional jockey career in 1926 and in 1928 scored his first major win in the King Edward Gold Cup at Woodbine Park Racetrack in Toronto. Riding principally in the United States, over the course of his career, Nick Wall had mounts in each of the American Classic Races with his best result in the Kentucky Derby coming in 1936 when he rode Coldstream to a fourth-place finish.

In 1938, Wall had his best year when he was the United States Champion Jockey by earnings. That year he won numerous important races at tracks in the New York and Boston area but earned national headlines for riding Stagehand to a victory over Seabiscuit in the Santa Anita Handicap at Arcadia, California.

Nick Wall continued to race successfully but a serious injury sustained in a 1945 race diminished his riding skills. At the time of his retirement in 1957 he had made 11,164 starts, earning 1,419 firsts, 1,305 seconds, plus 1,352 third-place finishes.

In 1940, Nick appeared in Monogram Pictures Corporation production of That Gang of Mine. He portrayed Jockey Jimmy Sullivan.

In 1979, Nick Wall was Inducted in Canada's Sports Hall of Fame and the Sport Newfoundland and Labrador Hall of Fame. He died in Bellerose, New York in 1983 at age seventy-six.

Filmography
 That Gang of Mine (1940) as Jockey Jimmy Sullivan (uncredited)

References

1906 births
1983 deaths
Canadian jockeys
American jockeys
American Champion jockeys
People from Bellerose, New York
People from Conception Bay South
Canadian emigrants to the United States
Emigrants from the Dominion of Newfoundland to Canada

External Links